Choose 1985 was a various artists "hits" collection album released in Australia in late 1984, a joint venture between record companies Festival, RCA, and EMI (Cat No. RML 50006). The album spent nine weeks at the top of the Australian albums chart from December 1984 to February 1985. This is the best selling compilation record of the 1980s.  The compilation album was available on LP and Cassette with 2 different covers (white or pink), as well as a selection of the songs' videos on VHS and Beta video cassette.  Notably, due to movie copyright restrictions, "Ghostbusters" was omitted from the video cassette release.

Track listing

"Ghostbusters" – Ray Parker Jr.
"Sunglasses at Night" – Corey Hart
"Pride (In the Name of Love)" – U2
"Missing You" – John Waite
"No Say In It" – Machinations
"You Think You're a Man" – Divine
"Dynamite" – Jermaine Jackson
"Searchin' (I Gotta Find a Man)" – Hazell Dean
"What's Love Got to Do with It" – Tina Turner
"Out of Touch" – Hall & Oates
"Soul Kind of Feeling" – Dynamic Hepnotics
"Jump (For My Love)" – Pointer Sisters
"Flesh for Fantasy" – Billy Idol
"No Second Prize" – Jimmy Barnes
"Shake This City" – Non Stop Dancers
"I Walk Away" – Split Enz
"Everybody Wants to Work" – Uncanny X-Men
"Agadoo" – Black Lace

Charts

References

1984 compilation albums
Pop compilation albums
Festival Records compilation albums